Letizia Roscher (born 7 October 2004) is a German pair skater. With her skating partner, Luis Schuster, she is the 2022 MK John Wilson Trophy bronze medalist. 

On the junior level, Roscher/Schuster are three-time German junior national champions and placed fifth at the 2022 World Junior Figure Skating Championships.

Personal life 
Roscher was born on 7 October 2004 in Chemnitz, Germany.

Programs

With Schuster

Competitive highlights 
GP: Grand Prix; CS: ISU Challenger Series; JGP: Junior Grand Prix

With Schuster

References

External links 

 

2004 births
Living people
German female pair skaters
Sportspeople from Chemnitz
Figure skaters at the 2020 Winter Youth Olympics